Paul Knuchel was a Swiss diver. He competed in the men's 3 metre springboard event at the 1920 Summer Olympics.

References

Year of birth missing
Year of death missing
Swiss male divers
Olympic divers of Switzerland
Divers at the 1920 Summer Olympics
Place of birth missing